Jeremiah Hichion (23 December 1865 – 8 September 1938) was an Irish hurler who played for Cork Championship club Aghabullogue. He played for the Cork senior hurling team for one season.

Playing career

Aghabullogue

Hinchion joined the Aghabullogue club when it was founded in the early years of the Gaelic Athletic Association. On 13 July 1890, he lined out for the team when Aghabullogue defeated Aghada by 7-03 to 1-01 to win the Cork Championship.

Cork

Hinchion made his first appearance for the Cork hurling team on 29 September 1890. He lined out on the team as Cork defeated Kerry by 2-00 to 0-01 to win the Munster Championship. Hinchion was again on the team on 16 November when Cork defeated Wexford by 1-06 to 2-02 in the All-Ireland final.

Honours

Aghabullogue
Cork Senior Hurling Championship (1): 1890

Cork
All-Ireland Senior Hurling Championship (1): 1890
Munster Senior Hurling Championship (1): 1890

References

External links

 Jeremiah Hinchion obituary

1865 births
1938 deaths
Aghabullogue hurlers
Cork inter-county hurlers
All-Ireland Senior Hurling Championship winners